The 1986 NCAA Division III Men's Ice Hockey Tournament was the culmination of the 1985–86 season, the 3rd such tournament in NCAA history. It concluded with Bemidji State defeating Plattsburgh State 8-5. All Quarterfinals matchups were held at home team venues, while all succeeding games were played in Bemidji, Minnesota.

Plattsburgh State's tournament performance was later vacated due to NCAA violations.

Qualifying teams
The following teams qualified for the tournament. There were no automatic bids, however, conference tournament champions were given preferential consideration. No formal seeding was used while quarterfinal matches were arranged so that the road teams would have the shortest possible travel distances.

Format
The tournament featured three rounds of play. In the Quarterfinals, teams played a two-game series to determine which school advanced to the Semifinals, with tied series decided by a 20-minute mini-game. Mini-game scores are in italics.  Beginning with the Semifinals all games became Single-game eliminations. The winning teams in the semifinals advanced to the National Championship Game with the losers playing in a Third Place game. The teams were seeded according to geographic proximity in the quarterfinals so the visiting team would have the shortest feasible distance to travel.

Bracket

Note: * denotes overtime period(s)Note: Mini-games in italics

All-Tournament Team
G: Jim Martin (Bemidji State)
D: Chris Panek (Plattsburgh State)
D: Dale Rivington (RIT)
F: Mike Alexander* (Bemidji State)
F: Tim Lescarbeau (Bemidji State)
F: Todd Lescarbeau (Bemidji State)
* Most Outstanding Player(s)

Record by conference

Plattsburgh State's record not included

References

External links
Division III Men's Ice Hockey Record Book

 
NCAA Division III ice hockey